Diddy Movies is a British children's comedy series on CBBC. It stars Richard McCourt, Dominic Wood (Dick and Dom) and Ted Robbins. It is a sequel series to the Diddy Dick and Dom sketches on Dick & Dom in da Bungalow. The series features fictional blockbuster movies headlined by the duo of Dick and Dom. Series 1 began on 19 March 2012, a Christmas special was aired on 19 December 2013 and Series 2 began on 4 March 2014. Many of the cast have been in other Dick and Dom sketch series or the sitcom The Legend of Dick and Dom.

Background
The series was announced by Dick and Dom on Something for the Weekend in 2012.

Plot
When Diddy Dick and Dom came to Hollywood, their boss, Larry wanted them to make movies and to become famous millionaires. After they made each movie, they sat down and watch their movies they made at the cinema. Each movie starts with an advert. But each movie filled with budgets for disastrous and hilarious parts and everything else. At the end of each movie, Dick and Dom tells Larry (and the audience) that the movie was great, but the audience paused and then they got outrage of disgust and the credits roll during the madness, but Dick and Dom ask Larry that they got an idea for their next movie about any subject, but Larry thinks it will be worst and to get so mad, but he likes it and gives them his money anyway.

Cast
Richard McCourt as Diddy Dick/Various
Dominic Wood as Diddy Dom/Various
Ted Robbins as Larry Weinsteinburger

Episodes

Series 1 (2012)

Series 2 (2013-2014)

Diddy TV

In 2016, a follow-up series to Diddy Movies was launched called Diddy TV which sees Diddy Dick and Dom having their own television station.

References

CBBC shows
BBC children's television shows
BBC Television shows
Children's television series